Paul v National Probation Service [2004] IRLR 190, [2003] UKEAT 0290_03_1311 is a UK labour law case, concerning the duty of an employer to make reasonable adjustments to accommodate employees with disabilities.

Facts
Mr Paul was chronically depressed, and was turned down for a job at the National Probation Service. This was on the basis of the employer's own medical report. But they did not go to ask the applicant's own doctor, or take steps to investigate how far the illness actually affected Mr Paul's potential work capability. Mr Paul claimed constructive dismissal under the Disability Discrimination Act 1995.

Judgment
The Employment Appeal Tribunal held that the employer did not consider its duty to adjust. It could not argue that it had no duty to accommodate Mr Paul, because a minimum step would be to look at what was possible. The simple first steps included getting advice from the claimant's own consultant and thinking about ways the job may also have been changed.

See also
UK employment discrimination law
UK labour law
Human Rights Act 1998

Notes

External links
National Probation Service's website

United Kingdom equality case law
Employment Appeal Tribunal cases
2003 in case law
2003 in British law